
Wanja is a given name and surname. Notable people with the name include:

First name
 Astrid Wanja Brune Olsen (born 1999), Norwegian tennis player
 Barbara Wanja (born 1959),  former freestyle swimmer from East Germany then known as Barbara Krause
 Dorothy Wanja Nyingi (born 1974), Kenyan ichthyologist
 Wanja Hlibka, singer with the Don Cossack Choir
 Wanja Lundby-Wedin (born 1952), Swedish trade unionist and politician
 Wanja Michuki, Kenyan businesswoman
 Wanja Ronald Ngah (born 12 September 1991),  Cameroonian footballer
 Wanja Mary Sellers (born 1962), American-Italian actress and director

Surname
Iwa Wanja (1905–1991), Bulgarian actress based in Germany
Janet Wanja (born 1984), Kenyan volleyball player
Lutz Wanja (born 1956), German swimmer
Mbangi Wanja, Sultan of Bagirmi, central Africa, from 1722 to 1736

Fictional characters
Wanja, character in Ngũgĩ wa Thiong'o's novel Petals of Blood (1977)

See also
Torsten and Wanja Söderberg Prize, Nordic design award
Vanja, a given name
Vanya (disambiguation)
Wangarr, a concept in Yolngu culture, also spelt Wanja